Newark station is a train station in Newark, Delaware, on Amtrak's Northeast Corridor, serving a limited number of Amtrak Northeast Regional trains and SEPTA Wilmington/Newark Line Regional Rail trains.

Service 

The Newark station is the southern terminus of weekday service for SEPTA's Wilmington/Newark Line; it does not serve the station on weekends or holidays. Like all stations in Delaware, SEPTA service is provided under contract and funded through DART First State. Amtrak Northeast Regional service at Newark station is limited; the station sees one train in each direction on weekdays, an additional northbound train on Thursdays and Fridays and an additional southbound train on Fridays, and three trains in each direction on weekends.

The station is located at Mopar Drive and South College Avenue, and travelers arriving at the station must walk a few blocks north along South College Avenue to reach the University of Delaware or the businesses centered on Main Street. A 380 space parking lot exists, mostly serving park and ride passengers bound for Wilmington, Delaware, or Philadelphia, Pennsylvania. The James F. Hall Trail also runs along the north side of the tracks.

History

The original station building, originally constructed by the Philadelphia, Wilmington and Baltimore Railroad in 1877, is adjacent to the southbound platform, and at one time also had connecting branches to Pomeroy, Pennsylvania and Delaware City, Delaware. It is now home to the Newark Historical Society, but does not function as a train station. It has been listed on the National Register of Historic Places since May 7, 1982. The station is built on a "T" plan with a hipped cross-gable roof and Victorian detailing such as ornamental brackets and sawtooth brickwork.

In 1986, Newark's city council authorized an application for a state of Delaware Bicentennial Improvement Fund grant for the acquisition and redevelopment of the Newark station, and on March 27, 1987, Amtrak deeded the station building to the city. By September, the city had hired John Milner Associates of West Chester, Pa., to develop architectural specifications for restoration. Restoration work encompassed the first floor ticket booths, the ladies' and men's waiting rooms, modernized upstairs offices, and rebuilt canopies on the exterior. SEPTA service was extended to Newark in 1997.

In 2012 a new federal grant was awarded to upgrade the station into a multi-modal hub. This includes new platform, eliminating grade crossings, upgrades to the adjacent rail yard and new ticketing machines.

Track upgrades to increase capacity between Newark and Wilmington rebuilt and reconfigured interlockings and added a third track to 1.5 miles of the line. Construction on these track upgrades was completed in 2020.

An extension of MARC's Penn Line commuter rail service from its current terminus at Perryville, Maryland has been discussed, connecting Newark to Baltimore and Washington, D.C. Currently, the MTA funds a local bus connection between Newark and Baltimore with a transfer at Elkton station. A bill in Maryland awaiting the signature of Governor Larry Hogan would extend MARC service from Perryville to Newark. In 2020, Representative Edward Osienski and Senator Stephanie Hansen cosponsored a resolution to the Delaware General Assembly that will add commuter rail service between Newark and Perryville, involving an extension of MARC service to connect with SEPTA at Newark and provide an alternate to Amtrak for Delaware residents wanting to travel to Baltimore and Washington, D.C. This resolution will be introduced into the Delaware General Assembly in 2021.

On July 17, 2017, construction began on a project that will add new tracks, accessible platforms and a new station building. A groundbreaking ceremony was held with Governor John Carney, U.S. Senators Tom Carper and Chris Coons, and U.S. Representative Lisa Blunt Rochester in attendance. The first phase of the project added more parking spaces and reconfigured the intersection with South College Avenue at the station. The second phase constructed the new station building, which has restrooms, a waiting area, and parking for bicycles. A covered pedestrian bridge is also planned to be constructed over the tracks. The new station will have a high-level accessible platform between two tracks, allowing the station to serve two trains at one time. On May 30, 2018, a groundbreaking ceremony was held for the new station building, with Governor Carney and Senator Carper in attendance. The new station building was completed in 2020. Construction contracts for advanced grading for track relocation to allow for the new platform are expected to be advertised in 2021 while construction contracts for the new pedestrian bridge and platform are expected to be advertised in 2022. Work on the track relocation and the new pedestrian bridge and platform is expected to be completed in 2023. The project will allow for the expansion of SEPTA service at the station and for a possible extension of MARC service from Maryland.

References

External links

SEPTA station page for Newark
Newark Amtrak & SEPTA Station (USA RailGuide -- TrainWeb)
DART Commuter Rail Improvement Plan
 College Avenue entrance from Google Maps Street View
 Station House from Google Maps Street View

SEPTA Regional Rail stations
Newark, Delaware
DART First State
Newark, Delaware
Buildings and structures in Newark, Delaware
Transportation buildings and structures in New Castle County, Delaware
Railway stations in the United States opened in 1877
Railway stations on the National Register of Historic Places in Delaware
National Register of Historic Places in New Castle County, Delaware
Railway stations in the United States at university and college campuses
Former Pennsylvania Railroad stations
Wilmington/Newark Line
Philadelphia, Wilmington and Baltimore Railroad